Katerini railway station is a railway station in Katerini, Central Macedonia, Greece. Located in a residential area close to the city centre, it opened on 2 September 1916. It is served by trains between Athens and Thessaloniki, and since 9 September 2007, it has been served by the Suburban railway for Thessaloniki, Litochoro and Larissa.

History
The station opened on 2 September 1916 as Katerinas when the connecting branch Papapouli-Platy was completed, which connected the Piraeus-Demerli-Sinoron Railway (S.P.D.S.) or “Larissaykos” with the Macedonia-Thrace network.

On 17 October 1925, The Greek government purchased the Greek sections of the former Salonica Monastir railway, and the railway became part of the Hellenic State Railways, with the remaining section north of Florina seeded to Yugoslavia. In 1970 OSE became the legal successor to the SEK, taking over responsibilities for most of Greece's rail infrastructure. On 1 January 1971, the station and most of the Greek rail infrastructure were transferred to the Hellenic Railways Organisation S.A., a state-owned corporation. In 2001 the infrastructure element of OSE was created, known as GAIAOSE; it would henceforth be responsible for the maintenance of stations, bridges and other elements of the network, as well as the leasing and the sale of railway assists. In 2003, OSE launched "Proastiakos SA", as a subsidiary to serve the operation of the suburban network in the urban complex of Athens during the 2004 Olympic Games. In 2005, TrainOSE was created as a brand within OSE to concentrate on rail services and passenger interface. The station reopened on 9 September 2007 as part of upgrades to the line to allow Proastiakos services to access the line. In 2008, all Proastiakos were transferred from OSE to TrainOSE.

In 2009, with the Greek debt crisis unfolding OSE's Management was forced to reduce services across the network. Timetables were cut back, and routes closed as the government-run entity attempted to reduce overheads. In 2015 a 15-year-old child was airlifted to a hospital after being electrocuted at the station. In 2017 OSE's passenger transport sector was privatised as TrainOSE, currently, a wholly owned subsidiary of Ferrovie dello Stato Italiane infrastructure, including stations, remained under the control of OSE.

Facilities
The station is still housed in the original early 20th-century brick-built station building. As of (2020) The station is staffed with a working ticket office. The station currently has 8 platforms; however, two are currently out of use. There are waiting rooms on platform one and waiting shelters on 2-6. Access to the platforms is via a subway under the lines. However, the station is not equipped with lifts. The platforms have shelters with seating; however, there are no Dot-matrix display departure and arrival screens or timetable poster boards on the platforms. The station, however, does have a buffet/restaurant on platform 1. There is also Parking in the forecourt.

Services
The station is on the main line of the Greek railway system that connects Athens in the south with Thessaloniki in the North. As a result, the city is connected directly with Larissa and Thessaloniki via the Proastiakos It is also connected with Athens and all the intermediate stations by Intercity train lines.

It is served by Local and Regional stopping services to Thessaloniki, Kalambaka and Palaiofarsalos and Intercity services. Since 2007, it has been served by Proastiakos Thessaloniki to Larissa and Thessaloniki. There are around 22 services that call at the station daily.

Gallery

See also
Proastiakos
P.A.Th.E./P.

References

External links
https://www.gtp.gr/TDirectoryDetails.asp?id=77318&lng=2

Railway stations in Central Macedonia
Railway stations opened in 1961
Buildings and structures in Pieria (regional unit)
Katerini